Gard Øyen (born December 14, 1943) is a Norwegian actor. He has performed at the Norwegian National Traveling Theater, the National Theater in Bergen, and at the Oslo New Theater for many years.

Øyen is the son of the actor Øyvind Øyen and the brother of Roald, Torill, and Jardar Øyen.

Filmography
1966: Hurra for Andersens! as Erik Hermansen
1967: Det største spillet as Gunvald Tomstad
1970: Ballad of the Masterthief Ole Hoiland as a soldier at Akershus
1972: Lukket avdeling as Guttungen
1981: Sølvmunn as a man on the airplane

References

External links
 
 Gard Øyen at the Swedish Film Database
 Gard Øyen at Sceneweb
 Gard Øyen at Filmfront

1943 births
Norwegian male stage actors
Norwegian male film actors
20th-century Norwegian male actors
21st-century Norwegian male actors
Male actors from Oslo
Living people